National Tertiary Route 612, or just Route 612 (or ) is a National Road Route of Costa Rica, located in the Puntarenas province.

Description
In Puntarenas province the route covers Coto Brus canton (San Vito, Pittier, Gutiérrez Braun districts).

History
As the main road between San Vito town and Elena town on Pittier district, MOPT announced on 22 October 2020 works to improve the road for a total of CRC ₡ 2,988,388,595.20 over 164 days.

References

Highways in Costa Rica